The Otis Elevator Company Factory Building is a historic industrial building located at 1435 W. 15th Street in the Near West Side neighborhood of Chicago, Illinois. The Otis Elevator Company had the factory built in 1900. The company, then the nation's largest elevator manufacturer, sought to grow its sales in Chicago, as the city's growth and numerous new skyscrapers made it a profitable market for elevators. The Chicago firm of Adler & Treat designed the factory as a brick building with Colonial Revival elements. The factory served as a regional headquarters until 1914, when Otis restructured and introduced smaller regional offices; while it continued to have a Chicago office, it sold the factory building. The Riley-Schubert-Grossman Company, a wholesaling firm, purchased the building in 1916; while it only occupied the building for a short time, its extensive remodeling gave it its present-day layout.

The building was added to the National Register of Historic Places on November 26, 2008.

References

Industrial buildings and structures on the National Register of Historic Places in Chicago
Colonial Revival architecture in Illinois
Industrial buildings completed in 1900
Otis Worldwide